The 2008–09 Short Track Speed Skating World Cup was a multi-race tournament over a season for short track speed skating. The season began on 18 October 2008 and ended on 15 February 2009. The World Cup was organised by the ISU who also ran world cups and championships in speed skating and figure skating.

Calendar

Men

United States

Canada

China

Japan

Bulgaria

Germany

Women

United States

Canada

China

Japan

Bulgaria

Germany

Overall Standings

Men

Women

See also
 2009 World Short Track Speed Skating Championships
 2009 World Short Track Speed Skating Team Championships
 2009 European Short Track Speed Skating Championships

References

External Links
 Results for 2008-2009 SEASON at the International Skating Union

ISU Short Track Speed Skating World Cup
2008 in short track speed skating
2009 in short track speed skating